Les Echos is the first daily French financial newspaper, founded in 1908 by the brothers Robert and Émile Servan-Schreiber. It is the main competitor of La Tribune, a rival financial paper.

History and profile
The paper was established as a monthly publication under the name of Les Échos de l'Exportation by the brothers Robert and Émile Servan-Schreiber in 1908. It became a daily newspaper in 1928 and was renamed as Les Echos. The newspaper was bought by the British media group Pearson PLC in 1988, and was sold to the French luxury goods conglomerate LVMH in November 2007. The publisher of the paper is Les Echos Le Parisien Médias.

Les Echos has a liberal stance and is published on weekdays. The paper is headquartered in Paris and has a website which was launched in 1996. The paper publishes economical analyses by leading economists, including Joseph Stiglitz and Kenneth Rogoff.

In September 2003, Les Echos switched from tabloid format to Berliner format. In 2004, the newspaper won the EPICA award.

In 2010, the coverage of Les Echos was expanded to cover such topics as innovations in science, technologies, green growth, medicine and health and skills concerning marketing and advertising, management, education, strategy and leadership, law and finance. The former separate sections of IT and communications were merged under the section of high tech and media.

In 2013, the newspaper started a project called LesEchos360, a business news aggregation platform.

Circulation
In 2000, Les Echos was the sixth best-selling newspaper in France with a circulation of 728,000 copies. The 2009 circulation of the paper was 127,000 copies. From July 2011 to July 2012, the paper had a circulation of 120,546 copies. In 2020, the newspaper had a total circulation of 135,196 copies.

References

External links
  

1908 establishments in France
Business newspapers
Centrist newspapers
Daily newspapers published in France
Liberal media in France
LVMH brands
Newspapers published in Paris
Publications established in 1908